All This Dancin' Around is the third studio album by Belgian rock band Triggerfinger, released on 12 November 2010. The album was recorded at the Sound City Studios in Van Nuys, California and RedStar Recording in Silverlake, California. The album was certified 'gold' on the Flemish Ultratop 50.

Track listing

Personnel
Ruben Block – lead vocals, guitar.
Paul Van Bruystegem – bass guitar, backing vocals.
Mario Goossens – drums, backing vocals.

Charts

Weekly charts

Year-end charts

References

External links
Band's official website.

2010 albums
Triggerfinger albums
Albums recorded at Sound City Studios